Hurdy-Gurdy Hare is a 1950 Warner Bros. Merrie Melodies cartoon short directed by Robert McKimson. The short was released on January 21, 1950, and stars Bugs Bunny.

Plot
While Bugs is sitting in Central Park, he looks through the wanted ads, finally focusing on a job as a Hurdy-Gurdy (actually, a street organ), thinking at first of 'the masters - Beethoven, Brahms, Bach' (pronounced by Bugs as 'Beat-hoven,' 'Brammz,' and 'Batch'), but soon, while playing "Artist's Life" on the organ, is thinking of all the money his monkey assistant was able to get from the various apartments he visited. When the monkey tries to stiff Bugs, Bugs chases him off ("Ya' can't trust no one!", he sneers), suddenly thinking he can do the same job as the monkey - but quickly finds out that people willing to give a monkey money aren't willing to give Bugs anything (except a bucket of water on the head).

The monkey runs to the zoo, where he tells a gorilla about what happened (the only intelligible words being Bugs' line "What's up doc? What's up doc? What's up doc?"). The monkey dramatizes being kicked by Bugs, which sends the gorilla in a frenzy. The gorilla breaks out of his cage and confronts Bugs. Bugs tells the gorilla that he's working, but the gorilla threatens him by punching a hole in the wall. Bugs is able to outwit the gorilla by asking the gorilla if he can inflate himself with his finger, causing the gorilla to literally inflate and float away from the ledge. Bugs tells the gorilla that what he's doing is too immature: "You're a big boy now. Take your finger out of your mouth!". The gorilla obliges, but falls many stories down from the apartment building. At one point, the gorilla gets tricked into unsuccessfully attempting to bounce off, only to crash into, the shaded entryway, falling through the basement and comes up an elevator, holding a newspaper and with his arm through a subway window. Bugs, acting as a conductor, orders the gorilla to "push in, plenty of room in the center of the car!", pausing to tell the audience "I used to work on the shuttle from Times Square to Grand Central", before pushing the gorilla back underground again where the train crashes into the gorilla off screen. Then, aping Ralph Edwards' famous declaration on Truth or Consequences, he says to the audience: "Ain't I a devil??".

Bugs then encounters the infuriated gorilla again ("Oh, back again, eh? Well, if you can't take a hint, I'll have to get tough. And another thing...STOP BREATHING IN MY CUP! I'll bet this kid won't take much more of this guff.") A chase then ensues, and Bugs tries getting away from the gorilla on the outside of the building by climbing up and down a ladder while the gorilla keeps pulling the ladder in the opposite direction (once using the Groucho Marx line: "I've seen you before, I never forget a face. But in your case, I'll make an exception."). Bugs eventually makes his way into one of the apartments, literally assembling a brick wall into a window to trap the gorilla and put an exploding cigar into the gorilla's mouth. After the exploding cigar explodes, the gorilla breaks out of the brick wall, then Bugs puts in a door where both the window and brick wall were, and tells the gorilla "There he goes, Doc! Out that Door!", thus tricking the gorilla into falling again. However, he's soon cornered by the gorilla, who is all bandaged up and then chases him into a back room.

Bugs spots a violin, and noting that "they say music calms the savage beast", he starts playing "Artist's Life" on the violin (about as well as Jack Benny might sound), which causes the gorilla not only to calm down, but to start dancing around. That gives Bugs an idea.

Moments later, as the monkey from earlier cranks the musical organ, the gorilla visits the apartments, raining piles of cash down on Bugs. Bugs counts all the money coming, noting to the audience: "I sure hope Petrillo doesn't hear about this!" (a then-topical gag referencing the president of the American Federation of Musicians, which was on strike in 1948 when the short was copyrighted).

See also
 List of Bugs Bunny cartoons

References

1950 films
1950 animated films
1950 short films
Merrie Melodies short films
Films directed by Robert McKimson
Bugs Bunny films
Animated films about gorillas
Films set in New York City
Films scored by Carl Stalling
1950s Warner Bros. animated short films
Films set in parks
Films set in zoos
Films set in hotels
1950s English-language films